Ollie Tanner (born 13 May 2002) is an English professional footballer who plays for York City on loan from Cardiff City, as a winger.

Career
Born in Bromley, Tanner played youth football for Charlton Athletic and Arsenal before joining the Bromley Academy. After playing for Lewes, in May 2022 it was announced that he would sign for Cardiff City on 10 June 2022. He had turned down a transfer to Premier League club Tottenham Hotspur in January 2022, receiving death threats from Tottenham fans as a result.

On 9 January 2023, Tanner joined National League club York City on loan for the remainder of the season.

References

2002 births
Living people
English footballers
Charlton Athletic F.C. players
Arsenal F.C. players
Bromley F.C. players
Lewes F.C. players
Cardiff City F.C. players
York City F.C. players
National League (English football) players
Isthmian League players
Association football wingers